Steven Craig Oddy (born 17 May 1979) is an English cricketer.  Oddy is a right-handed batsman who bowls right-arm medium pace.  He was born at Rochdale, Greater Manchester.

Oddy represented the Lancashire Cricket Board in 2 List A matches against the Yorkshire Cricket Board in the 2001 Cheltenham & Gloucester Trophy and Cheshire the 1st of the 2002 Cheltenham & Gloucester Trophy which was held in 2001.  In his 2 List A matches, he scored 3 runs at a batting average of 1.50, with a high score of 3.  With the ball he took 2 wickets at a bowling average of 23.00, with best figures of 2/27.

 he plays club cricket for Flowery Field Cricket Club. In 2013 Steve joined Denton West Cricket Club as professional and the team were crowned Lancashire County League champions at the end of the season. Steve is professional at Denton West Cricket Club in 2014.

References

External links
Steven Oddy at Cricinfo
Steven Oddy at CricketArchive

1979 births
Living people
English cricketers
Lancashire Cricket Board cricketers
Cricketers from Rochdale